A Woman Needs is the second solo studio album by American country music singer Jessica Harp, which was released on March 16, 2010 via Warner Bros. Nashville. It was released to digital retailers following a March 2, 2010 announcement that Harp would retire as a recording artist to focus on becoming a full-time songwriter. Prior to the announcement, the album was slated for a physical release as well in June 2010; instead, the physical copy is only available if ordered through Amazon.com. "Boy Like Me" and the title track were released as the album's first and second singles, respectively; both charted on the U.S. Billboard Hot Country Songs chart, with the former a Top 30 hit.

Reception
Blake Boldt of The 9513 gave A Woman Needs 3 and 1/2 stars, describing her favorably as a "notch above Nashville’s clutch of pretty blondes" with a "spicy southern twang." He also spoke positively of the production and the guest appearances of Vince Gill's harmony vocals (on "Homemade Love") and Keith Urban's guitar playing (on "Boy Like Me") as well as Carrie Underwood's co-writing (on "Good Enough for Me").

Track listing

Chart performance
A Woman Needs debuted at #31 on the U.S. Billboard Top Country Albums chart, selling 2,918 copies in its first week.

References

2010 albums
Jessica Harp albums
Warner Records albums